Mentor was launched in 1792 at Wemyss. With the out break of war with France in early 1793, the Royal Navy needed smaller vessels to protect convoys from privateers. The Navy employed Mentor as a hired armed vessel, releasing her from her contract at the end of 1801 after the signing of the Treaty of Amiens. She then returned to mercantile service, sailing first to Hamburg and then Oporto. She became a coaster on England's east coast, or a Baltic trader. She was last listed in 1832.

Career
Mentors contract with the Admiralty commenced on 24 March 1793.

Mentor was at Plymouth on 20 January 1795 and so shared in the proceeds of the detention of the Dutch naval vessels, East Indiamen, and other merchant vessels that were in port on the outbreak of war between Britain and the Netherlands.

On 2 March 1798 the frigate  captured the French privateer lugger Alexandrine, of Brest, near Bury Head. The privateer was armed with four swivel guns and one carriage gun, and had a crew of 28 men under the command of Captain Auseline Septan. She was six days out of Morlaix but had not taken any prizes. Mentor and the hired armed luggers Attack and Alarm were in company and shared in the prize money.      

Mentors contract as an hired armed ship ended on 13 November 1801.

Mentor first appeared in Lloyd's Register (LR) and the Register of Shipping (RS) in 1802. Lloyd's Register described her as a snow, but the Register of Shipping described her as a brig.

Clearly, Lloyd's Register and the Register of Shipping diverged in 1812. 

On 27 October 1818, Mentor, of London, Green, master, returned to Newcastle after having run aground. She had run on the stones as she was leaving Newcastle with a cargo of coal and became very leaky. It was expected that she would have to unload.

On 19 February 1826 Mentor, of Shields, struck the Cork Sand, in the North Sea off the coast of Essex and was abandoned. She subsequently came ashore near Woodbridge, Suffolk. Mentor was later refloated and taken in to Harwich, Essex.

Fate
Mentor was last listed in Lloyd's Register in the 1832 issue. She appeared in the 1833 issue of the Register of Shipping in 1833, but that register ceased publication after the 1833 issue.

Notes, citations, and references
Notes

Citations

References
 
 

1792 ships
Hired armed vessels of the Royal Navy
Age of Sail merchant ships of England